The Combat Paper is a project formed to help veterans cope with experiences in the war. It was based out of the Green Door Studio in Burlington, Vermont in the United States. Their processes include making paper out of their old uniforms to then create art on them as well as many other creative outlets for them to connect to fellow veterans. They have exhibits and workshops available to further expand their knowledge as well as connect on a more national level with others.

Combat Paper is a collaboration initiated by Drew Matott and Drew Cameron, involving war veterans, activists and artists.

Combat Paper is made using uniforms worn during military service. The uniforms are cut into pieces, cooked and macerated in a Hollander beater to make paper pulp. The pulp is then formed into paper sheets. Combat Paper has been used to make broadsides, books and personal journals, and the base for other printing processes.

In October 2009 utilizing a bike operated beater, Drew Matott, John LaFalce, Lee S. McDonald and Scott Meeker conducted a street intervention inviting attendees at the 2009 Friends of Dard Hunter Conference to cut pieces of military uniforms and place the pieces into the beater.

List of sponsors, supporting institutions and special collections

 The Studios of Key West, Key West, FL
 Longwood University, Farmville, VA
 Magnolia Editions, Oakland, CA
 The Beat Museum, San Francisco, CA
 Napa Valley Hand Papermaking, Napa, CA
 University of California Santa Barbara, Santa Barbara, CA
 International Printing Museum, Carson, CA
 Tarbeaux Press, Sierra Madre, CA
 Cabbage Head Press, Tempe, AZ
 Herberger College of Fine Arts, Arizona State University, Tempe, AZ
 Fresno City College, Fresno, CA
 The Caxton Club, Chicago, IL
 Art Institute of Washington, Washington, DC
 St. Lawrence University, Canton, NY
 Seastone Papers, West Tisbury, Martha's Vineyard, MA
 Friends of Dard Hunter, Tuscalusa, AL
 Rutgers University, New Brunswick, NJ
 Mills College, Oakland, CA
 San Francisco Public Library, San Francisco, CA
 Colorado Center for Handmade Paper, Colorado Springs, CO
 Colorado College, Colorado Springs, CO
 The Ottawa School of Art, Ottawa, Ontario, Canada
 National Alliance for the Mentally Ill
 Brooklyn Artists Alliance, Brooklyn, NY

Sponsors 

 The Studios of Key West, Key West, FL
 St. Lawrence University, Canton, NY
 Columbia College, Chicago, IL
 Iraq Veterans Against the War
 Booklyn Artists Alliance, Brooklyn, NY
 Radio Bean, Burlington, VT
 Speeder & Earl's, Burlington, VT
 Art Rage Gallery, Syracuse, NY
 The Beat Museum, San Francisco, CA
 Sara Nesson Productions, Burlington, VT
 Friends of Dard Hunter, Tuscaloosa, AL
 National Alliance for the Mentally Ill
 Cabbage Head Press, Tempe, AZ
 Herberger College of Fine Arts, Arizona State University, Tempe, AZ
 Art Institute of Washington, Washington, DC
 Longwood University, Farmville, VA
 International Printing Museum, Carson, CA
 Tarbeaux Press, Sierra Madre, CA
 Seastone Papers, Martha's Vineyard, MA
 Saratoga Library, Saratoga, CA
 The Caxton Club, Chicago, IL
 Magnolia Editions, Oakland, CA
 University of California Santa Barbara, Santa Barbara, CA
 Napa Valley Hand Papermaking, Napa, CA
 Fresno City College, Fresno, CA
 Mills College, Oakland, CA
 San Francisco Public Library, San Francisco, CA
 Colorado Center for Handmade Paper, Colorado Springs, CO
 Colorado College, Colorado Springs, CO
 The Ottawa School of Art, Ottawa, Ontario, Canada
 Rutgers University, New Brunswick, NJ

List of Special Collections 

 The Ames Library, Tate Archives & Special Collections, Illinois Wesleyan University
 Bailey/Howe Library, Special Collections, University of Vermont, Burlington, VT
 Bavarian State Library, Munich, Germany
 The Boston Athenæum, Special Collections, Boston, MA
 Carl Blegen Library, University of Cincinnati, Cincinnati, OH
 Hunter Library, Special Collections, Western Carolina University, Cullowhee, NC
 Lafayette College Libraries, Lafayette College, Easton, PA
 Library of Congress, Washington, DC
 Princeton University Library, Princeton, NJ
 Richard F. Brush Collection, St. Lawrence University, Canton, NY
 Scripps College, Special Collections, Claremont, CA
 Temple University, Special Collections, Philadelphia, PA
 University of California, Irvine, CA
 University of California Santa Barbara, Santa Barbara, CA
University of California, Santa Cruz, Santa Cruz, CA
 University of Central Florida, Orlando, FL
 University of Connecticut, Special Collections, Storrs, CT
 The Rare Book & Manuscript Library, University of Illinois at Urbana-Champaign
 University of Minnesota, Minneapolis, MN

References

External links
 Combat Paper Project
 Combat Paper Gallery
 July 30, 2009 Savannah Workshop Photos
 July 31, 2009 Savannah Morning News story by Pamela Walck
 July 24, 2009 Savannah Morning News story by Pamela Walck
 June 20, 2009 Savannah Morning News story by Pamela Walck

Non-profit organizations based in Vermont
Papermaking in the United States
Organizations based in Burlington, Vermont